Duke of Beaufort is a title in the Peerage of England. It was created by Charles II in 1682 for Henry Somerset, 3rd Marquess of Worcester, a descendant of Charles Somerset, 1st Earl of Worcester, legitimised son of Henry Beaufort, 3rd Duke of Somerset, a Lancastrian leader in the Wars of the Roses. The name Beaufort refers to a castle in Champagne, France (now Montmorency-Beaufort). It is the only current dukedom to take its name from a place outside the British Isles.

The Dukes of Beaufort descend in the male line from the House of Plantagenet through John of Gaunt, son of Edward III. This statement was challenged after the analysis of the Y chromosomal DNA of the remains of Richard III. Most living male heirs of the 5th Duke of Beaufort were found to carry a relatively common Y chromosome type, which is different from the rare lineage found in Richard III's remains. The instance of false paternity could have occurred anywhere in the numerous generations separating Richard III from the 5th Duke of Beaufort. The break also could have occurred with Richard III's grandfather Richard of Conisburgh, whose paternity has been called into question although he was acknowledged by his father.

The Beaufort Castle was in possession of John of Gaunt, and the surname Beaufort was given to Gaunt's four legitimised children by his mistress and third wife, Katherine Swynford. This was the foundation of the House of Beaufort, Dukes of Somerset. A descendant of the Beauforts through his mother was Henry VII of England. Charles Somerset, 1st Earl of Worcester,KG (c. 1460 – 15 March 1526), was the bastard son of Henry Beaufort, 3rd Duke of Somerset by his mistress Joan Hill.

The Duke of Beaufort holds two subsidiary titles – Marquess of Worcester (created 1642) and Earl of Worcester (created 1514). The title of Marquess of Worcester is used as a courtesy title by the duke's eldest son and heir. The title of Earl of Glamorgan is used by the eldest son of the heir apparent to the dukedom. The Earl of Glamorgan's eldest son is known as Viscount Grosmont. The Earldom of Glamorgan and Viscountcy of Grosmont derive from an irregular creation in 1644 by Charles I in favour of Edward Somerset, who later succeeded his father as 2nd Marquess of Worcester.

Although the Earldom of Glamorgan and Viscountcy of Grosmont were not recognised as substantive titles at the restoration of Charles II, because of irregularities in the patent of creation, they have nevertheless continued to be used as convenient courtesy titles in order to distinguish the bearer from the Marquess of Worcester as heir apparent, the Earldom of Worcester not being distinctive enough for this purpose. All subsidiary titles are in the Peerage of England.

Field Marshal The Lord Raglan, born Lord FitzRoy Somerset (1788–1855), was the youngest son of the fifth duke.

The family seat was once Raglan Castle in Monmouthshire, but  was Badminton House near Chipping Sodbury in Gloucestershire. The principal burial place of the Dukes and Duchesses of Beaufort is St Michael and All Angels' Church, Badminton.

Following the creation of the dukedom, each successive duke has served as Master of the Duke of Beaufort's Hunt, a foxhound pack kenneled on the Badminton Estate.

Descent from John of Gaunt
John of Gaunt, son of King Edward III and father of King Henry IV of England
John Beaufort, 1st Earl of Somerset, natural and legitimized son of John of Gaunt by Katherine Swynford
Edmund Beaufort, 4th Earl and 2nd Duke of Somerset, fourth and youngest son of the 1st Earl
Henry Beaufort, 3rd Duke of Somerset, son of the 4th Earl and 2nd Duke of Somerset; his natural son was created Earl of Worcester in 1514.

Earls of Worcester (1514)

Charles Somerset, 1st Earl of Worcester (c. 1450–1526), legitimised son of Henry Beaufort, 3rd Duke of Somerset and Joan Hill
Other titles (2nd onwards): Baron Herbert (1461)
Henry Somerset, 2nd Earl of Worcester (c. 1495–1548), only legitimate son of the 1st Earl
William Somerset, 3rd Earl of Worcester (d. 1589), eldest son of the 2nd Earl
Edward Somerset, 4th Earl of Worcester (1553–1628), only son of the 3rd Earl
Henry Somerset, 5th Earl of Worcester (1577–1646) was created Marquess of Worcester in 1643

Marquesses of Worcester (1642)
Other titles: Earl of Worcester (1514) and Baron Herbert (1461)
Henry Somerset, 1st Marquess of Worcester (1577–1646), eldest son of the 4th Earl, was a noted Cavalier
Edward Somerset, 2nd Marquess of Worcester (1601–1667), eldest son of the 1st Marquess, was an inventor. He has a claim to the invention of the steam engine.
Henry Somerset, 3rd Marquess of Worcester (1629–1700) was created Duke of Beaufort in 1682, after the Restoration
Henry Somerset, Lord Herbert (b. bef. 1660), eldest son of the 3rd Marquess, died in infancy

Dukes of Beaufort (1682)
Other titles: Marquesses of Worcester (1642) and Earl of Worcester (1514)
Other titles (1st–10th Dukes): Baron Herbert (1461)
Henry Somerset, 1st Duke of Beaufort (1629–1700), eldest son of the 2nd Marquess
Henry Somerset, Lord Herbert (b. before 1660), eldest son of the 1st Duke, died in infancy
Charles Somerset, Marquess of Worcester (1660–1698), second son of the 1st Duke, predeceased his father
Henry Somerset, 2nd Duke of Beaufort (1684–1714), only son of Lord Worcester
Henry Scudamore, 3rd Duke of Beaufort (1707–1745), eldest son of the 2nd Duke, died without issue
Charles Noel Somerset, 4th Duke of Beaufort (1709–1756), second and youngest son of the 2nd Duke
Other titles (5th–10th Dukes): Baron Botetourt (1305; abeyance ended 1803)
Henry Somerset, 5th Duke of Beaufort (1744–1803), only son of the 4th Duke
Henry Charles Somerset, 6th Duke of Beaufort (1766–1835), eldest son of the 5th Duke
Henry Somerset, 7th Duke of Beaufort (1792–1853), eldest son of the 6th Duke
Henry Charles FitzRoy Somerset, 8th Duke of Beaufort (1824–1899), only son of the 7th Duke
Henry Adelbert Wellington FitzRoy Somerset, 9th Duke of Beaufort (1847–1924), eldest son of the 8th Duke
Henry Hugh Arthur FitzRoy Somerset, 10th Duke of Beaufort (1900–1984), only son of the 9th Duke, died without issue, at which point his two Baronies fell into abeyance.
David Robert Somerset, 11th Duke of Beaufort (1928–2017), great-grandson of Rt. Hon. Lord Henry Richard Charles Somerset, second son of the 8th Duke
Henry John FitzRoy Somerset, 12th Duke of Beaufort (b. 22 May 1952), eldest son of the 11th Duke.

The heir apparent is the present holder's son, Henry Robert FitzRoy Somerset, Marquess of Worcester (b. 20 January 1989).

 Henry Somerset, 5th Duke of Beaufort (1744–1803)
 Henry Somerset, 6th Duke of Beaufort (1766–1835)
 Henry Somerset, 7th Duke of Beaufort (1792–1853)
 Henry Somerset, 8th Duke of Beaufort (1824–1899)
Lord Henry Somerset (1849–1932)
Henry Charles Somers Augustus Somerset (1874–1945)
Henry Robert Somers FitzRoy de Vere Somerset (1898–1965)
 David Somerset, 11th Duke of Beaufort (1928–2017)
 Henry Somerset, 12th Duke of Beaufort (b. 1952)
(1). Henry Robert FitzRoy Somerset, Marquess of Worcester (b. 1989)
(2). Henry, Earl of Glamorgan (b. 2021)
(3). Lord Alexander Lorne Somerset (b. 1995)
(4). Lord Edward Alexander Somerset (b. 1958)
(5). Lord John Robert Somerset  (b. 1964)
(6). Lyle David Somerset (b. 1991)
Lord Charles Somerset (1767–1831)
Henry Somerset (1794–1862)
Charles Henry Somerset (1819–1863)
Henry Plantagenet Somerset (1852–1936)
Charles William Henry Rollo Somerset (1895–1936)
male issue in line
Hereward Henry Plantagenet Somerset (1900–1989)
male issue in line
Henry George Edward Somerset (1829–1920)
Charles Wyndham Somerset (1862–1938)
Alan FitzRoy Somerset (1902–1940)
male issue in line
FitzRoy MacLean Henry Somerset (1839–1907)
FitzRoy Henry Somerset (1881–1946)
Raglan Henry Somerset (1903–1981)
Eugene Somerset (1929–1993)
male issue in line
John FitzRoy Somerset (1933–2003)
male issue in line
Harry Edward Somerset (1914–1991)
male issue in line
Poulett George Henry Somerset (1822–1875)
Vere Francis John Somerset (1854–1909) 
William Francis Somerset (1876–1942)
Lionel Francis Somerset (1903–1981)
male issue in line
Charles Somerset (1878–1941)
Henry Charles Fitzroy Somerset (1919–2006)
male issue in line
Lord Arthur John Henry Somerset (1780–1816)
George Henry Somerset (1809–1882)
FitzRoy John Henry Somerset (1851–after 1875)
any legitimate male issue and heirs in the male line
Lord William Somerset (1784–1851)
Henry Charles Capel Somerset (1816–1905)
 FitzRoy William Henry Somerset (1845–1878)
Raglan Somerset (1872–1940)
FitzRoy Raglan Somerset (1901–1985)
Raglan FitzRoy Somerset (1925–2002)
male issue in line
William Somerset (1822–1902)
Charles Edward Henry Somerset (1862–1939)
William Raglan Henry Guy Somerset (1912–1981)
William Michael John Charles Somerset (1934–2007)
male issue in line
FitzRoy Molyneux Henry Somerset (1823–1901)
Arthur William FitzRoy Somerset (1855–1937)
Arthur Plantagenet Francis Cecil Somerset (1889–1957)
John FitzRoy Pechell Somerset (1923–2019)
male issue in line
Rev. Boscawen Thomas George Henry Somerset (1833–1893)
William Horace Boscawen Somerset (1880–1946)
FitzRoy Douglas Boscawen Somerset (1923–2019)
male issue in line
 FitzRoy Somerset, 1st Baron Raglan (1788–1855)
  Barons Raglan

Coat of arms

The heraldic blazon for the coat of arms of the dukedom is: Quarterly, 1st and 4th, azure three fleurs-de-lys or (for France); 2nd and 3rd, gules three lions passant guardant in pale or (for England), all within a bordure compony argent and azure.

This can be translated as: a shield divided into quarters, the top left and bottom right quarters are blue with three golden fleurs-de-lys (for France), and the top right and bottom left quarters are red with three golden lions passant with their faces toward the viewer, one above the other (for England); the foregoing quarters are within a border around the shield with segments alternating white and blue.

In heraldry, a bordure compony is traditionally used to designate illegitimacy. Since the original Beaufort siblings' father was of the English royal family, the English royal arms are used. At that time, the king of England also claimed the French crown, hence the inclusion of the French royal arms.

Family tree

Ancestral armorial

See also
 Duchess of Beaufort
 Viscount Somerset
 Baron Raglan

References

Bibliography

External links
 

1682 establishments in England
 
Dukedoms in the Peerage of England
History of Worcestershire
Noble titles created in 1682